Chalakkal Rappai Iyyunni (1891–21 October 1961), an advocate from Thrissur in Kerala, was a prominent minister in the Kingdom of Cochin. He was an Indian independence advocate of the Indian National Congress, and served as a Member of Parliament after the first Indian general election in 1954. He and his wife were the first couple to be elected to the Legislative Assembly.

1891 births
1961 deaths
Indian civil rights activists
Indian independence activists from Kerala
Indian National Congress politicians from Kerala
Politicians from Thrissur
20th-century Indian lawyers
People of the Kingdom of Cochin